Astaire may refer to:

People 
 Adele Astaire (1896–1981), American dancer and entertainer
 Fred Astaire (1899–1987), American dancer, singer, and actor
 Jarvis Astaire (1923–2021), British boxing promoter and film producer
 Simon Astaire (born 1961), British novelist, screenwriter, media advisor, and film producer

Other uses 
 Astaire (horse), a racehorse
 Astaire, now Blondfire, a Brazilian-American band

See also
 Astar (disambiguation)
 Astair Airlines, a defunct Russian airline